) is a drink, a type of wine by-product made by peasants in the Tuscany region of Italy from the leftovers of wine production. Also called acquarello, mezzone, or vinello, it has been described as "a watered down wine of second choice" by Apergi and Bianco (1991, 87).

Origin
In Tuscany, the mezzadria peasants were involved in wine production, but most of the wine produced went to the landlord. As they were left with little to drink, they would make a kind of wine by mixing the stems, seeds, and pomace left over from the wine production with large quantities of water, bringing it to a boil, hermetically sealing it in a terracotta vase, and letting it ferment for several days. This resulted in a slightly effervescent drink, which was consumed as it was.

See also
 Acqua pazza (food)
 Piquette

References

Italian wine